Bruno & Marrone are a Brazilian sertanejo duo from Goiânia.

Bruno (b. Vinicius Felix de Miranda, 1969) performed for a decade as a solo musician before approaching Leandro e Leonardo for help finding a partner. They introduced him to Marrone (b. José Roberto Ferreira, 1964), a concertina player. Their debut was released by Warner Records in 1995; they have enjoyed a successful and prolific career since then, releasing more than one album per year. In 2002 they won a Latin Grammy for their DVD release.

Discography
1995: Bruno e Marrone – Vol. 1
1996: Bruno e Marrone – Vol. 2
1997: Acorrentado em Você
1998: Viagem
1999: Cilada de Amor
2000: Paixão Demais
2000: Sucessos De Bruno & Marrone
2000: Acústico 
2001: Dose Dupla
2001: Acústico ao Vivo
2002: Minha Vida Minha Música
2002: Os Gigantes
2002: Sonhos, Planos, Fantasias
2003: Inevitável
2004: Ao Vivo
2005: Meu Presente É Você
2006: Ao Vivo em Goiânia
2006: Sonhos, Amores E Sucessos(4 CDs)
2007: Acústico II Vol. 01
2007: Acústico II Vol. 02
2008: Maxximum
2009: O Melhor Ao Vivo
2009: De Volta Aos Barers
2009: Essencial
2010: Sonhando

Videography
2001: Acústico Ao Vivo (Abril Music)
2004: Ao Vivo (BMG)
2006: Ao vivo em Goiânia (BMG)
2007: Acústico II Ao Vivo (Sony / BMG)

References

[ Bruno & Marrone] at Allmusic

External links
Official website

Sertanejo music groups
Sertanejo musicians
Brazilian musical duos
Musical groups established in 1995
Country music duos